Ravens may refer to:
 Raven, a species of the genus Corvus

Sports
 Anderson Ravens, the intercollegiate athletic program of Anderson University in Indiana
 Baltimore Ravens,  a professional American football franchise
 Benedictine Ravens, the official mascot of Benedictine College
 Carleton Ravens, the intercollegiate athletic program of Carleton University in Canada
 Munich Ravens, German american-football team in the European League of Football
 Quincy Ravens, an 1890s minor league baseball team in Illinois
 Vancouver Ravens, a team that used to play in the National Lacrosse League

Other uses
 Ravens (film), a 2017 Swedish thriller film
 The Ravens, an American R&B music band
 "Ravens", a song by Patti Smith from Gone Again
 Ravens, a 2009 novel by George Dawes Green

People with the surname
 Jan Ravens (born 1958), an English actress and impressionist

See also
 Raven (disambiguation)
 Raven's Progressive Matrices, an intelligence test